The women's javelin throw event at the 1975 Pan American Games was held in Mexico City on 20 October.

Results

References 

Athletics at the 1975 Pan American Games
1975